Ivo Karamanski (November 29, 1959 in Sofia, Bulgaria – December 20, 1998) was a reputed Bulgarian mobster. His life was difficult from the very beginning with his mother dying when he was only four years old. In 1981 he became National and Balkan rowing champion. A colorful underworld character in the Bulgarian Mafia, he was reputed to be a killer "who never even shot a gun". His nickname was "the Godfather" and they also called him "Capo di tutti Capi".
His personal signature and phrase was "The good boys go in heaven, the bad ones wherever they want (like) to". He was also reportedly an informant for the communist State Security.

During his career, he founded the "Korona-ins" insurance company, and co-owned 20 other small companies. 

Karamanski and his bodyguard were gunned down in 1998 in what police termed a drunken quarrel.

References 

1959 births
1998 deaths
People from Dupnitsa
20th-century Bulgarian criminals
Murdered Bulgarian gangsters
People murdered in Bulgaria
Deaths by firearm in Bulgaria
Bulgarian gangsters